Essentials is a compilation album released by hip-hop artist Nate Dogg.  All 16 tracks are taken from Nate Dogg’s debut album G-Funk Classics, Vol. 1 & 2.

Track listing
"Nobody Does It Better" (Featuring Warren G)
"Who's Playin' Games?"
"I Don't Wanna Hurt No More" (Featuring Danny "Butch" Means)
"Me and My Homies" (Featuring 2Pac)
"Because I Got a Girl"
"Scared of Love" (Featuring Danny "Butch" Means)
"Just Another Day"
"Dogg Pound Gangstaville" (Featuring Snoop Dogg and Kurupt)
"No Matter Where I Go"
"Friends" (Featuring Snoop Dogg and Warren G)
"She's Strange" (Featuring Barbara Wilson)
"Never Leave Me Alone" (Featuring Snoop Dogg)
"My Money"
"Puppy Love" (Featuring Snoop Dogg, Daz Dillinger and Kurupt)
"Never Too Late"
"Hardest Man in Town"

References

Nate Dogg albums
2002 compilation albums